The Mogilev electoral district was a constituency created for the 1917 Russian Constituent Assembly election.

The electoral district covered the Mogilev Governorate. The SRs benefited from the fact that the leader heading the Mogilev Provincial Soviet of Peasants Deputies was largely popular in the province.

According to U.S. historian Oliver Henry Radkey, whose account forms the basis of the results in the table below, the vote count in Mogilev is largely incomplete. He claims to have the data for Gomel (with the votes for all 11 lists), Mogilev (with votes for the 7 most voted lists) and Orsha (with votes for the 6 most votes lists) towns as well as 80 precincts in Gomel uezd (but in these precincts, only the vote for SR and Bolshevik lists). The account of Soviet historian L. M. Spirin, shown to the right in the table and which Radkey did not consider reliable, includes a much greater number of votes accounted for the Mogilev electoral district.

In Gomel town, per Spirin's account, the Jewish National Electoral Committee obtained 6,010 votes (27.6%), Kadets 3,957 (18.2%), Menshevik-Bund 3,370 votes (15.5%), Bolsheviks 2,012 (9.3%), SRs 1,848 votes (8.5%), Polish list 1,584 votes (7.3%), United Jewish Socialist Labour Party 1,497 votes (6.9%), Poalei-Zion 761 votes (3.5%), White Russians 370 votes (1.7%), Landowners 220 votes (1%) and Folkspartei 114 votes (0.5%).

Results

References

Electoral districts of the Russian Constituent Assembly election, 1917
Mogilev Governorate